Newtown Wanderers Football Club was a Welsh football team based in Newtown, Powys, Wales.  The team last played in the Mid Wales Football League East Division, which is at the fourth tier of the Welsh football league system.

History
The club was established in 2010 by Sean and Jim McBride and Dave Aspinall with the support of the Elephant and Castle Hotel. The club played in the Montgomeryshire Football League until it took an opportunity from the restructure of the Welsh Football Pyramid to move to the Mid Wales Football League, joining the East Division in 2021. At the end of the season the club folded, citing staffing changes and lack of commitment from players.

Honours

External links
Club official Twitter

References

Association football clubs established in 2010
Association football clubs disestablished in 2022
2010 establishments in Wales
2022 disestablishments in Wales
Mid Wales Football League clubs
Montgomeryshire Football League clubs
Newtown, Powys
Sport in Powys
Defunct football clubs in Wales